Boquerón de Tonalá Flora and Fauna Protection Area is a protected natural area in southern Mexico. It is located in the Sierra Madre del Sur ranges in the state of Oaxaca.

Flora and fauna
According to the National Biodiversity Information System of Comisión Nacional para el Conocimiento y Uso de la Biodiversidad (CONABIO) in Boquerón de Tonalá Flora and Fauna Protection Area there are over 690 plant and animal species from which 25 are in at risk category and  8 are exotics.

References

Flora and fauna protection areas of Mexico
Protected areas of Oaxaca
Sierra Madre del Sur